The 1949–50 1re série season was the 29th season of the 1re série, the top level of ice hockey in France. Five teams participated in the league, and Racing Club de France won their first championship.

First round

Paris Group

Alpes Group

Final round

External links
Season on hockeyarchives.info

Fra
1949–50 in French ice hockey
Ligue Magnus seasons